The women's 50 metre freestyle S3 event at the 2012 Paralympic Games took place on 7 September, at the London Aquatics Centre.

Two heats were held, one with four swimmers and one with five swimmers. The swimmers with the eight fastest times advance to the finals.

Heats

Final

External links
Women's 50m Freestyle S3 at 2012 London Paralympic Games

Swimming at the 2012 Summer Paralympics
2012 in women's swimming